The men's 400 metres was an event at the 1968 Summer Olympics in Mexico City. The competition was held between 16–18 of October. Times are listed as both hand timing and automatic timing.  Hand timing was the official time used in the 1968 Olympics. Fifty-five athletes from 36 nations competed. The maximum number of athletes per nation had been set at 3 since the 1930 Olympic Congress. The event was won by Lee Evans of the United States, the fourth consecutive and 11th overall title in the event by an American. The Americans swept the podium, the second time a podium sweep occurred in the men's 400 metres (the United States had previously done it in 1904, when the nation had 10 of the 12 competitors).

Background

This was the sixteenth appearance of the event, which is one of 12 athletics events to have been held at every Summer Olympics. Andrzej Badeński of Poland, who had won bronze in 1964, was the only finalist from the Tokyo Games to compete again in 1968. The United States team was "dominant in this event in 1968"; Larry James held the world record at 44.1 seconds, Lee Evans was the AAU and NCAA champion, and even the third member of the team, Ron Freeman, ran well below Olympic record time at the U.S. trials.

Barbados, the Dominican Republic, El Salvador, Morocco, Nicaragua, and Sudan appeared in this event for the first time. The federation of Malaysia also competed for the first time, though Malaya had previously appeared. East and West Germany competed separately for the first time. The United States made its sixteenth appearance in the event, the only nation to compete in it at every Olympic Games to that point.

Competition format

The competition retained the basic four-round format from 1920. The "fastest loser" system, introduced in 1964, was available but not used in 1968 because there was no need to balance quarterfinals as there were 8 heats in the first round. Those heats each had between 6 and 8 athletes, with the top four advancing. The 4 quarterfinals each had 8 runners; the top four athletes in each quarterfinal heat advanced to the semifinals. The semifinals featured 2 heats of 8 runners each. The top four runners in each semifinal heat advanced, making an eight-man final.

Records

Prior to the competition, the existing World and Olympic records were as follows.

Lee Evans broke the Olympic record with a 44.8 second run in the second semifinal; both Larry James and Martin Jellinghaus matched the old record in that same semifinal. All three Americans broke the new record in the final, with Evans (43.8 seconds) and James (43.9 seconds) also coming in under the world record time. Evans' auto-timed result of 43.86 seconds was not official under the rules at that point (which used hand-timed results) but was later recognized as the initial world record upon the switch to automatic timing as official in 1977.

Schedule

The quarterfinals were held on the second day (with the semifinals) rather than the first day (with the first round heats), a change from previous years.

All times are Central Standard Time (UTC-6)

Results

Round 1

The top four runners in each of the eight heats advanced to the quarterfinal round.

Heat 1

Heat 2

Heat 3

Heat 4

Heat 5

Heat 6

Heat 7

Heat 8

Quarterfinals

The top four runners in each of the four heats advanced to the semifinal round.

Quarterfinal 1

Quarterfinal 2

Quarterfinal 3

Quarterfinal 4

Semifinals

Top four in each of the two heats advanced to the final round.

Semifinal 1

Semifinal 2

Final

Evans nearly withdrew from the final in protest of the expulsion of his college teammates Tommie Smith and John Carlos from the Games after their Black Power salute. Smith and Carlos, however, convinced him to compete. Evans and James were the first runners to achieve times below 44 seconds in the 400 metres.

References

External links
Official report

Men's 400 metres
400 metres at the Olympics
Men's events at the 1968 Summer Olympics